Świeszewo may refer to the following places:
Świeszewo, Gmina Pokrzywnica in Masovian Voivodeship (east-central Poland)
Świeszewo, Gmina Świercze in Masovian Voivodeship (east-central Poland)
Świeszewo, West Pomeranian Voivodeship (north-west Poland)